Airwave Invasion is a compilation album by the turntablist Rob Swift featuring his X-Ecutioners bandmates, Roc Raida and Mista Sinista. It was released on June 8, 2001, by Triple Threat Records and was produced by the X-Ecutioners. The album combined The X-Ecutioners scratches and productions with classic R&B and jazz songs.

Track listing
"You Are My Starship" feat. Norman Connors
"Unhooked Generation" feat. Freida Payne
"Singing A Song For My Mother" feat. Hamilton Bohannon
"You Roam When You Don't Get It At Home" feat. Sweet Inspirations
"Ghetto: Misfortune's Wealth" feat. 24 Karat Black
"Future Flavas Set #1" feat. Pete Rock & Marley Marl
"Save Their Souls" feat. Hamilton Bohannon
"On The Hill" feat. Oliver Sain
"Future Flavas Set #2"
"Tramp" feat. Lowell Fulsom
"Interlude"
"X-ecution Style" feat. Kool G. Rap & Big Pun
"WNYU Set" feat. Mr. Mayhem & DJ Riz
"The Creator Has A Master Plan" feat. Norman Connors
"Interlude"
"Don't It Drive You Crazy" Pointer Sisters
"Holy Thursday" feat. David Axelrod
"All That Scratching"

References

Rob Swift albums
The X-Ecutioners albums
2001 compilation albums